Every Vote Equal is a 2006 book addressing the rationales, strategies, and legal and administrative issues associated with the National Popular Vote Interstate Compact. It was made available online by National Popular Vote Inc. for free.

It includes forwards by John B. Anderson, Birch Bayh, John Buchanan and Tom Campbell.

External links
Every Vote Equal website where the book may be read or downloaded for free.
National Popular Vote, Inc. non-profit corporation.

2006 non-fiction books
Political books